Ana Lovrin ( or ; born 2 December 1953), is a Croatian politician. She held the post of Minister of Justice in the first and second cabinets under Prime Minister Ivo Sanader, from February 2006 to October 2008. She was the third female holder of that office, as well as being the third consecutive woman after Ingrid Antičević-Marinović and Vesna Škare-Ožbolt.

Lovrin was born in Zagreb and graduated from the University of Zagreb Faculty of Law. A member of the Croatian Democratic Union (HDZ) since 1993, Lovrin held several party and political posts in the city of Zadar, where she was deputy mayor under Božidar Kalmeta. After Kalmeta was appointed Minister in December 2003, she replaced him as mayor of Zadar. That same year she was also appointed chairman of Zadar HDZ, member of the Zadar County HDZ, and was made member of the HDZ central committee. In February 2006 she was also appointed minister, replacing Vesna Škare-Ožbolt, and continued to hold the post until October 2008 when she was replaced by a non-party minister Ivan Šimonović.

She was also elected to the 5th and 6th assembly of the Croatian Parliament, and currently serves as chairman of the parliamentary justice committee.

Family
Lovrin is married and a mother of four daughters.

References

External links
Ana Lovrin at the Croatian Parliament website 

1953 births
Living people
Politicians from Zagreb
Representatives in the modern Croatian Parliament
Croatian Democratic Union politicians
Faculty of Law, University of Zagreb alumni
Women mayors of places in Croatia
Justice ministers of Croatia
Mayors of Zadar
Women government ministers of Croatia
Female justice ministers